Citricoccus parietis is a Gram-positive and coccoid-shaped bacterium from the genus Citricoccus which has been isolated from a mould-colonized wall in Jena, Germany.

References

Bacteria described in 2010
Micrococcaceae